Braux may refer to the following places in France:

 Braux, Alpes-de-Haute-Provence, a commune in the department of Alpes-de-Haute-Provence
 Braux, Aube, a commune in the department of Aube
 Braux, Côte-d'Or, a commune in the department of Côte-d'Or
 Braux-le-Châtel, a commune in the department of Haute-Marne
 Braux-Sainte-Cohière, a commune in the department of Marne
 Braux-Saint-Remy, a commune in the department of Marne